George Henry Bowler (23 January 1890 – October 1948) was an English professional footballer who played in the Football League for Tottenham Hotspur and Derby County as a right half.

Career 
A right half, Bowler began his career at local club Gresley Rovers, before moving to First Division club Derby County in May 1911. He made one appearance before moving to Tottenham Hotspur, for whom he made three appearances during the 1913–14 season and would remain with the club during the First World War. He guested for Brentford in December 1915. Bowler moved to Southern League First Division club Luton Town in 1919, but retired after failing to force his way into the first team squad.

Personal life 
On 15 December 1914, four months after Britain's entry into the First World War, Bowler enlisted as a private in the 1st Football Battalion of the Middlesex Regiment. The battalion was deployed to the Western Front in November 1915, where Bowler fought on the Somme, at Arras, and at Cambrai. Bowler remained in the battalion until its disbandment in February 1918, when he was transferred to the 2nd Football Battalion. In June 1918, Bowler was transferred to the 18th London Regiment, where he would remain until after the end of the war and his demobilisation in 1919.

Career statistics

References 

1890 births
1948 deaths
Military personnel from Derbyshire
People from Newhall, Derbyshire
Footballers from Derbyshire
English footballers
English Football League players
Gresley F.C. players
Derby County F.C. players
Tottenham Hotspur F.C. players
Luton Town F.C. players
Brentford F.C. wartime guest players
British Army personnel of World War I
Middlesex Regiment soldiers
Association football wing halves
London Irish Rifles soldiers